Myeloblastin (leukocyte proteinase 3, leukocyte proteinase 4, Wegener's granulomatosis autoantigen, proteinase PR-3, proteinase-3, PMNL proteinase) is an enzyme. This enzyme catalyses the following chemical reaction: Hydrolysis of proteins, including elastin, by preferential cleavage: -Ala-  >  -Val-

This enzyme is present in polymorphonuclear leukocyte granules. Downregulation of myeloblastin in promyelocytic leukemia cells was shown to induce their growth arrest and differentiation.

See also 
 Proteinase 3

References

External links 
 

EC 3.4.21